John Drury may refer to:

 John Drury (Canon of Windsor) (died 1446), Medieval English priest
John Drury (Mayor of Sandwich) (died 1457)
 John Drury (television anchor) (1927–2007), American television anchorman and activist for ALS research
 John Drury (dean of Christ Church) (born 1936), Anglican priest
 John W. Drury (born 1952), investment banker from Australia
 John Drury (social psychologist) (fl. 1992–present), lecturer on social psychology at the University of Sussex
 John Drury (cricketer) (1874–1919), English cricketer